Tetrarhanis ilala is a butterfly in the family Lycaenidae. It is found in Cameroon, Gabon, the Republic of the Congo, the Central African Republic, the Democratic Republic of the Congo, Sudan, Uganda and Kenya. The habitat consists of primary forests.

Subspecies
Tetrarhanis ilala ilala (southern Sudan, Uganda, western Kenya)
Tetrarhanis ilala etoumbi (Stempffer, 1964) (Cameroon, Gabon, Congo, Central African Republic, Democratic Republic of the Congo)

References

Butterflies described in 1929
Poritiinae